Tecapa is a complex stratovolcano in central El Salvador.

See also
 List of volcanoes in El Salvador
 List of stratovolcanoes

References 
 

Mountains of El Salvador
Stratovolcanoes of El Salvador